Rod Reddy (born 1 March 1954) is an Australian former professional rugby league footballer and coach. He played in the NSWRL Premiership for the St. George Dragons between 1972 and 1983 and the Illawarra Steelers between 1984 and 1985. He also represented Queensland in the State of Origin and the Australia national rugby league team. He coached the Adelaide Rams for their only two seasons.

Playing career
Born in Rockhampton, Queensland, Reddy joined Sydney's St. George Dragons club in 1972 and stayed for 12 seasons. He was a member of premiership winning teams in 1977 and 1979. Reddy made the first of 17 representative appearances for Australia in 1977, and is listed on the Australian Players Register as Kangaroo No. 497. He was selected to go on the 1978 Kangaroo tour of Great Britain and France and in the first Test was named man-of-the-match. Reddy was selected to play for Queensland in the first State of Origin match played on 8 July 1980. He was one Australia's "Invincibles" in the 1982 Kangaroo tour of Great Britain and France. Reddy moved to the Illawarra Steelers in 1984 and played for one last season in 1985 before retiring.

Coaching career

Rod Reddy took on a player-coach role at Barrow in 1987. Barrow earned promotion to Division One but that campaign saw Barrow manage only one league win and suffer a club record 90-0 defeat at Leeds. Reddy was sacked and Denis Jackson took over as a caretaker coach for the rest of 1989/90

After a successful coaching stint with Cumbria, Reddy took on the reserve grade coaching duties position Brian Smith at St George.  He was appointed Smith’s successor as coach in 1996 but embraced the Super League concept and walked out on his former club before a match was played. After sitting out the 1996 season along with fellow St. George Super League loyalist Gorden Tallis while Super League successfully lodged its appeal, Reddy was the inaugural coach of the Adelaide Rams in 1997’s Super League season.

After a poor start to the 1998 season, Reddy and his coaching staff were sacked by the Rams’ administration, and the club folded at the end of the year.

Reddy was the assistant coach at the Wests Tigers under head coach Jason Taylor but departed the club in 2015 being sacked by Jason Taylor in a cleanout.  On 25 July 2019, Reddy labelled Wests player Robbie Farah the "Most selfish player I have ever been involved with while either playing the game or coaching bar none".  Reddy went on to say “Well we were right he went to Souths and played reserve grade and that Wests Tigers team at the moment is a reserve grade team with 4/5 NRL players in it and Farah is not 1 of them".  The comments came in the wake of Farah speaking about Reddy and Taylor to the media days earlier when Farah said “At the time I was told by him and ‘Rocket’ Reddy, I’d finish my career in reserve grade. But I’m here now - ‘JT’ is coaching reserve grade".

Family
He is the father of Perth Glory football goalkeeper Liam Reddy, Adelaide Thunderbirds netball goalkeeper Bianca Reddy, South Sydney Rabbitohs rugby league back Joel Reddy and academically inclined Kurt Reddy.

Accolades
Reddy was awarded Life Membership of the St. George Dragons in 1981.
On 20 July 2022, Reddy was named in the St. George Dragons District Rugby League Clubs team of the century.

References

External links
 Rod Reddy at stateoforigin.com.au
 Rod Reddy at eraofthebiff.com
Queensland Representatives at qrl.com.au

1954 births
Living people
Adelaide Rams coaches
Australia national rugby league team players
Australian sportspeople of Indian descent
Australian rugby league coaches
Barrow Raiders coaches
Barrow Raiders players
Illawarra Steelers players
Queensland Rugby League State of Origin players
Rod
Rugby league locks
Rugby league players from Rockhampton, Queensland
Rugby league second-rows
St. George Dragons players